Agapitus is venerated as a martyr saint, who died on August 18, perhaps in 274, a date that the latest editions of the Roman Martyrology say is uncertain.

According to his legend, 16-year-old Agapitus, who may have been a member of the noble Anicia family of Palestrina, was condemned to death, under the prefect Antiochus and the Emperor Aurelian, for being a Christian. After being captured and tortured during the persecution of Aurelian, he was taken to the local arena in Palestrina and thrown to the wild beasts. However, the animals refused to touch him and he was thus beheaded.

Veneration 

Agapitus is mentioned in the ancient martyrologies, including the Martyrologium Hieronymianum of Jerome, the Fulda Martyrology. Based on doubts regarding the details of his martyrdom, some of which were related in earlier editions of the Roman Martyrology, editions from the end of the 20th century onward give only: "In Palestrina, Lazio, Saint Agapitus, martyr." Around the 5th century, Pope Felix III built a basilica in his honour on the supposed site of his martyrdom. His relics were kept in the basilica, and a cemetery grew around it. At some uncertain date, his relics were transferred to the present cathedral of Palestrina. Some of them were transferred to Besançon.

Agapitus is honoured in the Tridentine Calendar by a commemoration added to the Mass and canonical hours in the liturgy of the day within the Octave of the Assumption. Pope Pius XII abolished all octaves apart from those of Christmas, Easter, and Pentecost, including that of the Assumption. Accordingly, in the General Roman Calendar of 1960 the celebration of Saint Agapitus appears as a commemoration in the ordinary weekday Mass.

References

External links 

 Saint Agapitus
 Sant' Agapito 

Christian child saints
3rd-century births
260s deaths
3rd-century Christian martyrs
Executed Italian people
Murdered Italian children